Deepti Bhagwan Sharma (born 24 August 1997) is an Indian cricketer who plays for Bengal, Birmingham Phoenix and India. She is an all-rounder who bats left-handed and bowls right-arm off break and is currently ranked 3rd in the top all-rounders in the ICC Cricket Rankings. She is also the current third highest individual scorer by a woman cricketer in ODIs (188 runs).

Early life 

Deepti Sharma was born to Sushilaa and Bhagwan Sharma. She is the youngest among her siblings. Her father is a retired chief booking supervisor with the Indian Railways. She developed interest in the game of cricket at an early age of 9. Deepti would on daily basis ask her father to request her brother Sumit Sharma (who initially coached her), a former Uttar Pradesh pacer, to take her to the ground and watch the net practices and other matches. During one of the net practices which involved her brother and his teammates at the Ekalavya Sports Stadium in Agra, she was asked to throw the ball back into play. The ball hit the stumps on a direct throw from 50 Meters distance. This was spotted by then India's national women's team selector, Hemlata Kala and it was the turning point of her life.

By the time she reached the age of 15, she had enough experience but was always overlooked by the selectors for state teams selection. Her all-round abilities slowly caught the eye of few other selectors and Rita Dey a former Indian batter and selector, decided to mentor her.

Deepti Sharma started off as a medium pacer but had to shift to slow off-spin bowling. The switch wasn't easy for her as it was not coming naturally. Only after guidance and counselling from her local coaches and selectors, she mastered the art of spin bowling owing to her height.

She kept delivering spectacular performance in state as well as A side matches. But it was her performance against South Africa in her debut international match in Bengaluru, that she cemented her place in the national side.

Career
Deepti Sharma made her ODI International debut in 2014 against South Africa in Bengaluru. The match was part of the ICC Women's Championship.

Sharma was involved in a world record opening partnership of 320 runs with Poonam Raut, with the former contributing 188 runs. Thus, breaking both the standing women's record of 229 (by Sarah Taylor and Caroline Atkins of England) and the standing men's record in ODIs of 286 (by Upul Tharanga and Sanath Jayasuriya of Sri Lanka). This partnership helped the Indian team in scoring 358 for three in 50 overs against Ireland women at Potchefstroom during the quadrangular series which also included South Africa women and Zimbabwe women teams held in South Africa.

Deepti Sharma was part of the Indian team to reach the final of the 2017 Women's Cricket World Cup where the team lost to England by nine runs. She scored 216 runs from 8 matches at an average of 30.86 and picked up 12 wickets from 9 matches played with best bowling figures of 3 for 59 from 7.1 overs against Australia.

Sharma's bowling best figures in her career is 6-20 that she claimed in the final ODI against Sri Lanka at Ranchi.

The all-rounder was roped in to play for Bengal in Senior women's domestic season 2017–18, alongside Jhulan Goswami. She was the top run scorer in the season scoring 312 runs at an average of 104 in 6 matches with an impressive strike rate of 65.13.Her highest score was 77 and hit five half centuries. Deepti also picked up a total of 9 wickets with best figures of 3 for 26 against Vidarbha in Kolkata.

In the ongoing Senior women's domestic season 2018–19, Bengal is currently placed 2nd in the standings. She has scored 313 runs from 6 matches and currently in the top run scorer of the season. Deepti already has 2 centuries and one half century against her name in the 6 matches that she has played and highest score being 106 not out against Baroda  in Bengaluru. She has also taken 13 wickets with best figures of 4 for 12 against Kerala in Bengaluru.

In October 2018, she was named in India's squad for the 2018 ICC Women's World Twenty20 tournament in the West Indies. The Indian team lost in the semi-finals against England by 8 wickets. She took only 5 wickets in the tournament with her best being 2 for 15 in 3 overs against Ireland.

In June 2018, she was awarded with the Jagmohan Dalmiya Trophy For Best Domestic Senior Women's Cricketer by the Board of Control for Cricket in India (BCCI).

In June 2019, she was signed up to play for the Western Storm in the Kia Super League. In January 2020, she was named in India's squad for the 2020 ICC Women's T20 World Cup in Australia. In 2021, she was drafted by London Spirit for the inaugural season of The Hundred.

In May 2021, she was named in India's Test squad for their one-off match against the England women's cricket team. Sharma made her Test debut on 16 June 2021, for India against England.

She plays for Sydney Thunder in the 2021 WBBL. In January 2022, she was named in India's team for the 2022 Women's Cricket World Cup in New Zealand. In July 2022, she was named in India's team for the cricket tournament at the 2022 Commonwealth Games in Birmingham, England.

India all-rounder Deepti Sharma was sold to UP Warriorz for Rs 2.6 crore at the Women’s Premier League Auction in Mumbai on Monday.

References

External links

 

1997 births
Living people
Sportspeople from Agra
Cricketers from Uttar Pradesh
Indian women cricketers
India women Test cricketers
India women One Day International cricketers
India women Twenty20 International cricketers
Uttar Pradesh women cricketers
Bengal women cricketers
Western Storm cricketers
IPL Trailblazers cricketers
IPL Velocity cricketers
UP Warriorz cricketers
Recipients of the Arjuna Award
London Spirit cricketers
Sydney Thunder (WBBL) cricketers
Cricketers at the 2022 Commonwealth Games
Commonwealth Games silver medallists for India
Commonwealth Games medallists in cricket
Medallists at the 2022 Commonwealth Games